25 Beautiful Homes is a monthly interior design magazine published by IPC Media. It has been edited by Deborah Barker since 2009.

History and profile
25 Beautiful Homes was started in 1998. The magazine's first editor was Sally O'Sullivan before leaving IPC Media to set up her own company Cabal Communications. The magazine is published on a monthly basis.

The circulation of 25 Beautiful Homes was 101,566 copies between July and December 2013 and 97,611 copies during the first half of 2014.

References

External links
 

Monthly magazines published in the United Kingdom
Design magazines
English-language magazines
Magazines established in 1998
1998 establishments in the United Kingdom